Corcuera, officially the Municipality of Corcuera (Asi: Banwa it Corcuera, Filipino: Bayan ng Corcuera), is a 5th class municipality in the province of Romblon, Philippines. According to the 2020 census, it has a population of 10,112 people.

Located on Simara Island, it is named after the Spanish governor-general Sebastián Hurtado de Corcuera who ruled the Philippines from 1635 to 1644 on behalf of King Philip IV of Spain.

History

Early history
The island's name, Simara, was derived from the local word sima, meaning "hook", which refers to how the island looks like. Corcuera was originally established as San Jose by the Spanish in 1574. In 1621, Augustinian Recollect missionaries arrived in the island and converted the locals into Christianity. By 1726, a stone church dedicated to Saint Joseph was built through the initiative of Fr. Agustin de San Pedro, also known as El Padre Capitan. He also ordered the construction of a watchtower in Tacasan, which would serve as a lookout and warning for the locals of impending Muslim raids that plagued the province at that time.

Modern history

The first Justice of Peace was Liborio Fabiala. He was appointed on 1 August 1901. The year American Civil Government started in the province and the whole country. In 1910, during the American colonization period, the town was visited by the American survey ship Fathomer which conducted hydrographic surveys and depth sounding in the waters around Simara Island. Its American crew also constructed a lighthouse which is still standing today. At that time, Corcuera was still administered as part of Banton municipality on nearby Banton Island. In January 1931, Corcuera was granted local autonomous government by virtue of Chief Executive Order No. 292, Series of 1930 initiated by then Governor Manuel T. Albero. Corcuera then became the third island municipality in the province. The inauguration of Corcuera as a maiden municipality was held on February 3, 1931.

During World War II, the Japanese established a garrison at Tanro-aw Hill in the island. On March 10, 1945, American and Filipino soldiers who were liberating the Philippines from Japanese occupation launched a task force from Mindoro to liberate the islands of Romblon and Simara. On March 12, elements from Companies B and C of the 19th Infantry, 24th Division of the US 8th Army landed in Simara led by 1st Lt. David B. Bernard. They were assisted by the USS Haas, skippered by Lt. Cmdr. A. M. White.

After four days of mortar and naval bombardment and heavy fighting, the Americans were able to subdue the Japanese in Tanro-aw and liberate the island. The fighting left 118 Japanese, 10 Americans, and one Filipino dead.

Geography
Corcuera has a total land area of 23.40 km2. It is hemmed in by bodies of water from all sides: on the north and east by the Sibuyan Sea; on the south and east by Tablas Strait. It is a hilly, volcanic island with many hot springs, while stretches of flat land lie along its northern coast.

Climate

Barangays
Corcuera is politically subdivided into 15 barangays.

Demographics

According to the 2015 census, it has a population of 10,283 people.  Majority of this population speak the vernacular Asi language, which is also spoken in Banton, Concepcion, Calatrava, and Odiongan. The island's inhabitants are predominantly Roman Catholic, with a small number of Protestants, Iglesia ni Cristo, and Jehovah's Witnesses.

Economy

Corcuera has a primarily agricultural economy, with rice and copra farming, as well as fishing, as the main sources of livelihood. There is also an indigenous raffia palm handicraft industry. Other crops grown in the island are root crops (such as cassava, sweet potatoes), fruits and vegetables. The locals also engage in livestock raising for local consumption.

Government

Pursuant to Chapter II, Title II, Book III of Republic Act 7160 or the Local Government Code of 1991, the municipal government is composed of a mayor (alkalde), a vice mayor (bise alkalde) and members (kagawad) of the legislative branch Sangguniang Bayan alongside a secretary to the said legislature, all of which are elected to a three-year term and are eligible to run for three consecutive terms.

The mayor of Corcuera is the municipal executive of the town. The incumbent mayor and vice mayor as of 30 June 2019 are Elmer M. Fruelda and Aubrey "Apple" Fondevilla respectively, both from the Nacionalista Party.

 Died in office. 
 Served in acting capacity. 
 Resigned.

Tourism
Corcuera has a number of historical and cultural attractions. Tourist spots on the island include:
 Cotta Tower: This tower is what remains of a Spanish fort constructed between 1860 and 1865 by Fr. Agustin de San Pedro, also known as El Padre Capitan, to ward off Muslim pirates. It is situated on a hill overlooking Barangay Poblacion and is an easy 150-meter hike from the town plaza.
 Tanro-aw Hill: Located in Barangay Vicente, it is the site of a Japanese garrison during World War II.
 Panorama Point: A roadside lookout in Barangay Tacasan where passing inter-island shipping vessels can be viewed. The area also shelters boats during inclement weather.
 Immaculate Conception Grotto: Located at the summit of Mount Anradoon in Barangay Mangansag, this grotto of the Immaculate Conception offers devotees a place to go and pray during Lenten season.
 Payayasog: This testes-like structure that hangs along the bank of the sea in Barangay Mangansag was formed by geological and wave movement.
 Mangansag Beach: A white sand beach in Barangay Mangansag dotted with tall palm trees and volcanic boulders along pristine waters.
 Colong-Colong Beach: A sandy beach with pristine waters which is a picnic destination for local folks and returning residents.
 Mahaba Beach: This is a long stretch of white beaches along pristine waters north of the island.
 Guin-iwagan Cave: This cave in Barangay Mahaba features a dome-like structure that abounds in stalagmites and stalactites. There is a pool of cool water where one can swim.
 Lis-ong Cave: This cave in Barangay Colong-Colong has stalactite and stalagmite deposits.

Transportation
As seas surrounding Corcuera can be rough during the wet season, the best time to visit the island is from March to May during the dry (summer) season. This is also the typical time for Asi families living in Metro Manila or abroad to visit the island since it coincides with the Lenten season and barangay fiestas.

By sea Corcuera is accessible via RORO vessels that ply the Manila-Odiongan, Batangas City-Odiongan, or the Roxas-Odiongan route. From Odiongan, Corcuera can be reached by jeepney and motorized boat via Calatrava, Romblon.

By air The closest airport with active airline service is Tugdan Airport in Alcantara, Romblon. Fil-Asian Airways offers four weekly flights while SkyJet offers charter flights to Romblon from Manila. From Alcantara, Corcuera can be reached in 5–6 hours by jeepney and motorized boats from Calatrava.

Within the island, the main forms of transportation are passenger motorcycles (known elsewhere as habal-habal) and motorized boats. A circumferential road connects the 15 barangays of Corcuera to each other.

References

External links
Corcuera Profile at PhilAtlas.com
Corcuera Profile - Cities and Municipalities Competitive Index
[ Philippine Standard Geographic Code]
Philippine Census Information
Local Governance Performance Management System
Website of Simara Island, Romblon

Municipalities of Romblon
Island municipalities in the Philippines